Arthur G. Elliott Jr. (October 17, 1916 – August 18, 2003) was an American politician from the state of Michigan.

Elliott had resided in Royal Oak, Pleasant Ridge and Birmingham; all located in Oakland County.  He was a delegate to the Republican National Convention from Michigan in 1960 and 1964.  He was a delegate to the Michigan State Constitutional Convention from Oakland County 5th District, 1961–1962.  He served as Chairman of the Michigan Republican Party 1963–1965.

See also

References 

 The Political Graveyard

1916 births
2003 deaths
American Christian Scientists
Michigan Republican Party chairs
Michigan Republicans
Politicians from Indianapolis
People from Royal Oak, Michigan
People from Pleasant Ridge, Michigan
People from Birmingham, Michigan